William Boroughs (30 December 1864 – 16 January 1943) was an English cricketer. He played for Gloucestershire between 1899 and 1901.

References

1864 births
1943 deaths
English cricketers
Gloucestershire cricketers
Sportspeople from Cheltenham